Groupie Girl is a 1970 British drama film about the rock music scene, directed by Derek Ford and starring Esme Johns, Donald Sumpter and the band Opal Butterfly.  The film was written by Ford and former groupie Suzanne Mercer.

Ford later complained to Cinema X magazine "we were shooting in a discotheque one Saturday night and my ears rang right through to Monday morning.  I was sick -physically sick- on Sunday from the noise level we suffered".

The film was released in America in December 1970 by American International Pictures as I am a Groupie and in France in 1973- with additional sex scenes- as Les demi-sels de la perversion (The Pimps of Perversion).  The film was later re-released in France in 1974 as Les affamées du mâle (Man-Hungry Women) this time with hardcore inserts credited to ‘Derek Fred’.

Groupie Girl was released on UK DVD in January 2007 on the Slam Dunk Media Label as part of the ‘Saucy Seventies’ series (the earlier US DVD release on the Jeff films label is an unauthorized bootleg.)

Cast
 Billy Boyle as Wesley
 Donald Sumpter as Steve
 Richard Shaw as Morrie
 Esme Johns as Sally
 James Beck as Brian
 Paul Bacon as Alfred
 Neil Hallett as Detective Sergeant
 Flanagan as Thief
 Eliza Terry as Suzy
 Belinda Caren as Pat
 Trevor Adams as Barry
 Ken Hutchison as Colin
 Jimmy Edwards as Bob
 Jenny Nevison as Moira
 Opal Butterfly as Themselves

Soundtrack listing
(Original album)

Side 1
"You’re A Groupie Girl" (Opal Butterfly)
"To Jackie" (English Rose)
"Four Wheel Drive" (The Salon Band)
"Got A Lot Of Life" (Virgin Stigma)
"I Wonder Did You" (Billy Boyle)
"Gigging Song" (Opal Butterfly)
"Disco 2" (The Salon Band)
"Now You're Gone, I’m A Man" (Virgin Stigma)
Side 2
"Yesterday's Hero" (English Rose)
"Love Me, Give A Little" (Virgin Stigma)
"Looking For Love" (Billy Boyle)
"Sweet Motion" (The Salon Band)
"Love’s a Word Away" (English Rose)
"True Blue" (The Salon Band)
"Groupie Girl, It Doesn’t Matter What You Do" (Virgin Stigma)

 English Rose were Lynton Guest, Jimmy Edwards and Paul Wolloff, who also have minor roles in the film. Guest later became a sports journalist and recently authored the book "The Trials of Michael Jackson".

References

External links
 

1969 films
1969 drama films
Films about groupies
British drama films
Films directed by Derek Ford
1970s English-language films
1960s English-language films
1960s British films
1970s British films